This is a list of arenas that currently serve as the home venue for NCAA Division I college basketball teams. Conference affiliations reflect those in the current 2022–23 season; all affiliation changes officially took effect on July 1, 2022. The arenas serve as home venues for both the men's and women's teams except where noted. In addition, venues which are not located on campus or are used infrequently during the season have been listed.

All listed capacities are the full normal capacities for basketball, and do not reflect attendance restrictions due to COVID-19.

Current arenas

Notes

Additional arenas

Future arenas

This list includes facilities that are currently under construction, as well as existing facilities of schools that have announced future moves to NCAA Division I. Conference affiliations reflect those known to be in place as of the team's entry into Division I or the venue's opening, as applicable.

Notes

References

Are
Arenas
 
NCAA Division I basketball
Basketball
College basketball in the United States lists